Mobarakeh (also Romanized as Mobārakeh; also known as Mobarakeh Pishkooh) is a village in Ramsheh Rural District, Jarqavieh Olya District, Isfahan County, Isfahan Province, Iran. At the 2006 census, its population was 301, in 85 families.

References 

Populated places in Isfahan County